Laura Pierre-James (born 13 January 1956) is a Trinidad and Tobago sprinter. She competed in the women's 200 metres at the 1972 Summer Olympics. She was the first woman to represent Trinidad and Tobago at the Olympics.

References

External links
 

1956 births
Living people
Athletes (track and field) at the 1972 Summer Olympics
Trinidad and Tobago female sprinters
Olympic athletes of Trinidad and Tobago
Place of birth missing (living people)
Olympic female sprinters